Ibn ʿArabī (full name: , ; 1165–1240), nicknamed al-Qushayrī and Sulṭān al-ʿĀrifīn ('Sultan of the Knowers'), was an Arab Andalusian Muslim scholar, mystic, poet, and philosopher, extremely influential within Islamic thought. Out of the 850 works attributed to him, some 700 are authentic while over 400 are still extant. His cosmological teachings became the dominant worldview in many parts of the Muslim world.

His traditional titular is Muḥyīddīn (The Reviver of Religion). After he died, among practitioners of sufism he is renowned by the honorific title Shaykh al-Akbar which the "Akbarian" school derives its name, and make him known as Doctor Maximus (The Greatest Teacher) in medieval Europe. Ibn ʿArabī was considered as a saint by some scholars and Muslim community.

Biography
Ibn ʿArabī born in Murcia, Al-Andalus on the 17th of Ramaḍān 560 AH (28 July 1165 AD), or other sources suggested 27th of Ramaḍān 560 AH (5 August 1165 AD). His first name is Muhammad, but later called 'Abū 'Abdullāh (mean: the father of Abdullāh)—according to classical Arabic tradition—after he had a son. In some of his works, Ibn ‘Arabî referred to himself with fuller versions of his name as Abû ‘Abdullâh Muhammad ibn ‘Alî ibn al-‘Arabî al-Tâ’î al-Hâtimî, where the last three names indicating his noble Arab lineage. And indeed, Hâtim al-Tây’î was well known as a poet of pre-Islamic Arabia from the South Arabian tribe of Tayyi (now Yemen).

Family
Ibn ʿArabī's maternal ancestry was North African Berber. In his Futūḥāt al-Makkīyah, he writes of a deceased maternal uncle, Yahya ibn Yughan al-Sanhaji, a prince of Tlemcen who abandoned wealth for an ascetic life after encountering a Sufi mystic. Whereas his paternal ancestry came from Yemen and belongs to one of the oldest Arab strains in Andalusia. His paternal ancestors emigrated very early to Andalusia, probably during the second wave of the Muslim conquest of the Iberian Peninsula.

His father, ‘Ali ibn Muḥammad, served in the Army of Ibn Mardanīsh, the ruler of Murcia. When Murcia fell to the Almohad Caliphate in 1172, Ibn Mardanīsh  did not survive the defeat and was killed in battle, leading to his father pledging allegiance to the Almohad Caliph Abū Ya’qūb Yūsuf I. At that time Ibn ʿArabī was only 7 years old, and his family relocated from Murcia to Seville to serve the new ruler.

Ibn ʿArabī had three wives. He married Maryam, a woman from an influential family, when he was still a young adult and lived in Andalusia. Maryam also shared his aspiration to follow the Sufi path, as quoted by Austin in Sufis of Andalusia: "My saintly wife, Maryam bint Muhammad binti Abdun, said, ‘I have seen in my sleep someone whom I have never seen in the flesh, but who appears to me in my moments of (spiritual) ecstasy. He ask me whether I was aspiring to the Way, to which I replied that I was, but that I did not know by what means to arrive at it. He then told me that I would come to it through five things: trust, certainty, patience, resolution and veracity.’ Thus she offered her vision to me (for my consideration) and I told her that was indeed the method of the Folk (Sufis). I myself have never seen one with that degree of mystical experience." When Ibn ʿArabī stayed in Anatolia for several years, according to various Arabic and Persian sources, he married the widow of Majduuddin and took charge of the education of his young son, Sadruddin al-Qunawi. Ibn ʿArabī also mentioned his third wife in his writings, the mother of his son Imāduddin, to whom he bequeathed the first copy of Futūḥāt al-Makkīyah.

The First Vision

Ibn ʿArabī grew up at the ruling court and received military training. As he confessed in Futūḥāt al-Makkīyah, he preferred playing in military camp with his friends rather than reading a book. However, it was when he was a teenager that he experienced his first vision (fanā); and later he wrote of this experience as "the differentiation of the universal reality comprised by that look". 

His father, on noticing a change in him, had mentioned this to philosopher and judge, Ibn Rushd (Averroes), who asked to meet Ibn Arabi. Ibn Arabi said that from this first meeting, he had learned to perceive a distinction between formal knowledge of rational thought and the unveiling insights into the nature of things. He then adopted Sufism and dedicated his life to the spiritual path. When he later moved to Fez, in Morocco, Mohammed ibn Qasim al-Tamimi became his spiritual mentor. In 1200 he took leave from one of his most important teachers, Shaykh Abu Ya'qub Yusuf ibn Yakhlaf al-Kumi, then living in the town of Salé.

Pilgrimage to Mecca

Ibn Arabi left Andalusia for the first time at age 36 and arrived at Tunis in 1193. After a year in Tunisia, he returned to Andalusia in 1194. His father died soon after Ibn Arabi arrived at Seville. When his mother died some months later he left Andalusia for the second time and travelled with his two sisters to Fez, Morocco in 1195. He returned to Córdoba, Andalusia in 1198, and left Andalusia crossing from Gibraltar for the last time in 1200. While there, he received a vision instructing him to journey east. After visiting some places in the Maghreb, he left Tunisia in 1201 and arrived for the Hajj in 1202. He lived in Mecca for three years, and there began writing his work Futūḥāt al-Makkiyya, The Meccan Illuminations—only part of which has been translated into English by various scholars such as Eric Winkel.

Journeys north

After spending time in Mecca, he traveled throughout Syria, Palestine, Iraq and Anatolia. In 1204, Ibn Arabi met Shaykh Majduddīn Isḥāq ibn Yūsuf (شيخ مجد الدين إسحاق بن يوسف), a native of Malatya and a man of great standing at the Seljuk court. This time Ibn Arabi was travelling north; first they visited Medina and in 1205 they entered Baghdad. This visit offered him a chance to meet the direct disciples of Shaykh ‘Abd al-Qādir Jīlānī. Ibn Arabi stayed there only for 12 days because he wanted to visit Mosul to see his friend ‘Alī ibn ‘Abdallāh ibn Jāmi’, a disciple of the mystic Qaḍīb al-Bān (471-573 AH/1079-1177 AD; قضيب البان). There he spent the month of Ramaḍan and composed Tanazzulāt al-Mawṣiliyya (تنزلات الموصلية), Kitāb al-Jalāl wa’l-Jamāl (كتاب الجلال والجمال, "The Book of Majesty and Beauty") and Kunh mā lā Budda lil-MurīdMinhu.

Return south
In the year 1206 Ibn Arabi visited Jerusalem, Mecca and Egypt. It was his first time that he passed through Syria, visiting Aleppo and Damascus.

Later in 1207 he returned to Mecca where he continued to study and write, spending his time with his friend Abū Shujā bin Rustem and family, including Niẓām.

The next four to five years of Ibn Arabi's life were spent in these lands and he also kept travelling and holding the reading sessions of his works in his own presence.

End of Life

After leaving Andalusia for the last time at the age of 33 (1198 AD) and wandering in Islamic world for about 25 years, at the age of 58 Ibn Arabi chose Damascus as his final home and dedicated his life for teaching and writing. In this city, he composed Fushūsh Al-Ḥikam in 1229 and finalized two manuscripts of Futūḥāt al-Makkiyya in 1231 and 1234. 

Ibn Arabi died on 22 Rabī‘ al-Thānī 638 AH (16 November 1240) at the age of seventy-five. His was buried in the Banu Zaki cemetery, family cemetery of the nobles of Damascus, on Qasiyun Hill, Salihiyya, Damascus.

After his death, Ibn Arabi's teachings quickly spread throughout the Islamic world. His writings were not limited to the Muslim elites, but made their way into other ranks of society through the widespread reach of the Sufi orders. Arabi's work also popularly spread through works in Persian, Turkish, and Urdu. Many popular poets were trained in the Sufi orders and were inspired by Arabi's concepts.

Others scholars in his time like al-Munawi, Ibn 'Imad al-Hanbali and al-Fayruzabadi all praised Ibn Arabi as ''A righteous friend of Allah and faithful scholar of knowledge'', ''the absolute mujtahid without doubt'' and ''the imam of the people of shari'a both in knowledge and in legacy, the educator of the people of the way in practice and in knowledge, and the shaykh of the shaykhs of the people of truth though spiritual experience (dhawq) and understanding''.

Islamic law
Although Ibn Arabi stated on more than one occasion that he did not blindly follow any one of the schools of Islamic jurisprudence, he was responsible for copying and preserving books of the Zahirite or literalist school, to which there is fierce debate whether or not Ibn Arabi followed that school. Ignaz Goldziher held that Ibn Arabi did in fact belong to the Zahirite or Hanbali school of Islamic jurisprudence. Hamza Dudgeon claims that Addas, Chodkiewizc, Gril, Winkel and Al-Gorab mistakenly attribute to Ibn ʿArabī non-madhhabism. 

On an extant manuscript of Ibn Ḥazm, as transmitted by Ibn ʿArabī, Ibn ʿArabī gives an introduction to the work where he describes a vision he had:

Goldziher says, “The period between the sixth (hijri) and the seventh century seems also to have been the prime of the Ẓāhirite school in Andalusia.”

Ibn Arabi did delve into specific details at times, and was known for his view that religiously binding consensus could only serve as a source of sacred law if it was the consensus of the first generation of Muslims who had witnessed revelation directly.

Ibn Arabi also expounded on Sufi Allegories of the Sharia building upon previous work by Al-Ghazali and al-Hakim al-Tirmidhi.

Al-Insān al-kāmil
The doctrine of perfect man (Al-Insān al-Kāmil) is popularly considered an honorific title attributed to Muhammad having its origins in Islamic mysticism, although the concept's origin is controversial and disputed. Arabi may have first coined this term in referring to Adam as found in his work Fusus al-hikam, explained as an individual who binds himself with the Divine and creation.

Taking an idea already common within Sufi culture, Ibn Arabi applied deep analysis and reflection on the concept of a perfect human and one's pursuit in fulfilling this goal. In developing his explanation of the perfect being, Ibn Arabi first discusses the issue of oneness through the metaphor of the mirror.

In this philosophical metaphor, Ibn Arabi compares an object being reflected in countless mirrors to the relationship between God and his creatures. God's essence is seen in the existent human being, as God is the object and human beings the mirrors. Meaning two things; that since humans are mere reflections of God there can be no distinction or separation between the two and, without God the creatures would be non-existent. When an individual understands that there is no separation between human and God they begin on the path of ultimate oneness. The one who decides to walk in this oneness pursues the true reality and responds to God's longing to be known. The search within for this reality of oneness causes one to be reunited with God, as well as, improve self-consciousness.

The perfect human, through this developed self-consciousness and self-realization, prompts divine self-manifestation. This causes the perfect human to be of both divine and earthly origin. Ibn Arabi metaphorically calls him an Isthmus. Being an Isthmus between heaven and Earth, the perfect human fulfills God's desire to be known. God's presence can be realized through him by others. Ibn Arabi expressed that through self manifestation one acquires divine knowledge, which he called the primordial spirit of Muhammad and all its perfection. Ibn Arabi details that the perfect human is of the cosmos to the divine and conveys the divine spirit to the cosmos.

Ibn Arabi further explained the perfect man concept using at least twenty-two different descriptions and various aspects when considering the Logos. He contemplated the Logos, or "Universal Man", as a mediation between the individual human and the divine essence.

Ibn Arabi believed Muhammad to be the primary perfect man who exemplifies the morality of God. Ibn Arabi regarded the first entity brought into existence was the reality or essence of Muhammad (al-ḥaqīqa al-Muhammadiyya), master of all creatures, and a primary role-model for human beings to emulate. Ibn Arabi believed that God's attributes and names are manifested in this world, with the most complete and perfect display of these divine attributes and names seen in Muhammad. Ibn Arabi believed that one may see God in the mirror of Muhammad. He maintained that Muhammad was the best proof of God and, by knowing Muhammad, one knows God.

Ibn Arabi also described Adam, Noah, Abraham, Moses, Jesus, and all other prophets and various Anbiya' Allah (Muslim messengers) as perfect men, but never tires of attributing lordship, inspirational source, and highest rank to Muhammad. Ibn Arabi compares his own status as a perfect man as being but a single dimension to the comprehensive nature of Muhammad. Ibn 'Arabi makes extraordinary assertions regarding his own spiritual rank, but qualifying this rather audacious correlation by asserting his "inherited" perfection is only a single dimension of the comprehensive perfection of Muhammad.

Reaction
The reaction of Ibn 'Abd as-Salam, a Muslim scholar respected by both Ibn Arabi's supporters and detractors, has been of note due to disputes over whether he himself was a supporter or detractor. He was known by the title of Sultan al-'Ulama, the Sultan of scholars, was a famous mujtahid, Ash'ari theologian, jurist and the leading Shafi'i authority of his generation. As such, the figure of Ibn 'Abd al-Salam was claimed by each faction of the Ibn-'Arabi controversy due to his impeccable record as a staunch champion of the shari'a.

Ibn Taymiyyah's report was based on the authority of two reliable transmitters, Abu Bakr b. Salar and Ibn Daqiq al-'Id. According to it, Ibn 'Abd al-Salam declared Ibn 'Arabi "a master of evil" and "a disgusting man", who "professed the eternity of the world and did not proscribe fornication." This severe verdict, whose authenticity Ibn Taymiyyah considered to be beyond doubt, was pronounced by Ibn 'Abd al-Salam upon his arrival in Egypt in 639/1241- that is, one year after the death of the Greatest Master. The versions of the story furnished by al-Safadi, a cautious supporter of Ibn 'Arabi, and al-Dhahabi, his bitter critic, and teacher of al-Safadi, are especially helpful in placing Ibn 'Abd al-Salam's censure into a meaningful historical framework. Both al-Safadi and al-Dhahabi insisted that they read the story recorded in Ibn Sayyid al-Nas's own hand. And yet, their versions vary. Both variants describe Ibn Daqiq al-'Id's astonishment at his teacher's sharp critique of the acclaimed wali, which caused him to ask for proof of Ibn 'Arabi's lies. Ibn 'Abd al-Salam obliged by the following reply (in al-Safadi's recension): "He used to deny [the possibility] of marriage between human beings and the jinn, since, according to him, the jinn are subtle spirits, whereas human beings are solid bodies, hence the two cannot unite. Later on, however, he claimed that he had married a woman from the jinnfolk, who stayed with him for a while, then hit him with a camel's bone and injured him. He used to show us the scar on his face which, by that time, had closed." In al-Dhahabi's rendition: "He [Ibn 'Arabi] said: I married a she-jinni, and she blessed me with three children. Then it so happened that I made her angry and she hit me with a bone that caused this scar, whereupon she departed and I have never seen her again since." The authenticity of Ibn 'Abd al-Salam's disparagement of Ibn 'Arabi seems to find support in his "Epistle on the [Saintly] Substitutes and the [Supreme] Succor" (Risala fil-'abdal wal-ghawth)

On the other hand, another narration in praise of Ibn 'Arabi by al-Izz is reported by 'Abd al-Ghaffar al-Qusi, al-Fayruzabadi, al-Qari al-Baghdadi, al-Suyuti, al-Sha'rani, al-Maqqari, Ibn al-'Imad, and some other supporters of the Greatest Master. Despite minor variations in their accounts, all of them cite the same source: lbn 'Abd al-Salam's unnamed servant or student. In al-Qusi's redaction, Ibn 'Abd al Salam and his servant were passing by Ibn 'Arabi, who instructed his disciples in the Great Umayyad Mosque of Damuscus. Suddenly, the servant recalled that Ibn 'Abd al-Salam had promised to reveal to him the identity of the supreme saint of the epoch, the "Pole of the Age". The question caught Ibn 'Abd al-Salam off guard. He paused hesitantly for a moment, then pointed in the direction of Ibn 'Arabi, saying: "He is the Pole!" "And this in spite of what you have said against him?" asked the servant. Ibn 'Abd al-Salam ignored this remark and simply repeated his reply. In al-Fayruzabadi's version of the story, Ibn 'Abd al-Salam is presented as a secret admirer of the Greatest Master who was fully aware of the latter's exalted status in the Sufi hierarchy. However, as a public figure, Ibn 'Abd al-Salam was careful to conceal his genuine opinion of the controversial Sufi in order to "preserve the outward aspect of the religious law". In so doing, he, according to al-Fayruzabadi, shrewdly avoided an inevitable confrontation with the "jurists," who viewed Ibn 'Arabi as a heretic.

The importance of Ibn 'Abd al-Salam's ambiguous evaluation of the Greatest Master for the subsequent polemic is further attested by the detailed treatment of this story in al-Fasi's massive biographical dictionary, "The Precious Necklace" (al-'lqd al-thamin). A bitter critic of Ibn 'Arabi's monistic views, al-Fasi rejected the Sufi version of the story as sheer fabrication. Yet, as a scrupulous muhaddith, he tried to justify his position through the methods current in hadith criticism: "I have a strong suspicion that this story was invented by the extremist Sufis who were infatuated with Ibn 'Arabi. Thereupon the story gained wide diffusion until it reached some trustworthy people, who accepted it in good faith .... My suspicion regarding the authenticity of this story has grown stronger because of the unfounded supposition that Ibn 'Abd al-Salam's praise of Ibn 'Arabi had occurred simultaneously with his censure of him. Ibn 'Abd al-Salam's statement that he censured Ibn 'Arabi out of concern for the shari'a inescapably implies that Ibn 'Arabi enjoyed a high rank in the same moment as Ibn 'Abd al-Salam was censuring him. Such a blunder could not have happened to any reliable religious scholar, let alone to someone as knowledgeable and righteous as Ibn 'Abd al-Salam. Anyone who suspects him of this makes a mistake and commits a sin [by holding him responsible for] mutually contradictory statements .... One may try to explain Ibn 'Abd al-Salam's praise of Ibn 'Arabi, if it indeed took place, by the fact that [Ibn 'Abd al-Salam] was hesitating between praise and censure, because at the time he spoke Ibn 'Arabi's state had changed for the better. If so, there is no contradiction in Ibn 'Abd al-Salam's words. Were we to admit that the praise really occurred, it was nevertheless abrogated by Ibn Daqiq al-'Id's report concerning lbn 'Abd al-Salam's [later] condemnation of lbn 'Arabi. For Ibn Daqiq al-'Id could only hear Ibn 'Abd al-Salam in Egypt, that is, a few years after Ibn 'Arabi's death. This cannot be otherwise because he ... was educated at Qus, where he had studied the Maliki madhhab, until he mastered it completely. Only then he came to Cairo to study the Shafi'i madhhab and other sciences under Ibn 'Abd al-Salam's guidance. ... His departure could only take place after 640, by which time Ibn 'Arabi had already been dead. ... Now, Ibn 'Abd al-Salam's praise, as the story itself testifies, occurred when Ibn 'Arabi was still alive. For did he not point to [Ibn 'Arabi], when that individual [the servant] asked him about the Pole or the [greatest] saint of the age?"

Creed 

His best-known book, entitled 'al-Futuhat al-Makkiyya' (The Meccan Victories or Illuminations) which begins with a statement of doctrine (belief) about which al-Safadi (d. 764/1363) said: "I saw (read) that (al-Futuhat al-Makkiyya) from beginning to end. It consists of the doctrine of Abu al-Hasan al-Ash'ari without any difference (deviation) whatsoever."

Works

Some 800 works are attributed to Ibn Arabi, although only some have been authenticated. Recent research suggests that over 100 of his works have survived in manuscript form, although most printed versions have not yet been critically edited and include many errors. A specialist of Ibn 'Arabi, William Chittick, referring to Osman Yahya's definitive bibliography of the Andalusian's works, says that, out of the 850 works attributed to him, some 700 are authentic while over 400 are still extant.
 The Meccan Illuminations (Al-Futūḥāt al-Makkiyya), his largest work in 37 volumes originally and published in 4 or 8 volumes in modern times, discussing a wide range of topics from mystical philosophy to Sufi practices and records of his dreams/visions. It totals 560 chapters. In modern editions it amounts to some 15 000 pages.
 The Ringstones of Wisdom (also translated as The Bezels of Wisdom), or Fusus al-Hikam. Composed during the later period of Ibn 'Arabi's life, the work is sometimes considered his most important and can be characterized as a summary of his teachings and mystical beliefs. It deals with the role played by various prophets in divine revelation. The attribution of this work (Fusus al-Hikam) to Ibn Arabi is debated and in at least one source is described as a forgery and false attribution to him reasoning that there are 74 books in total attributed to Sheikh Ibn Arabi of which 56 have been mentioned in "Al Futuhat al-Makkiyya" and the rest mentioned in the other books cited therein. However many other scholars accept the work as genuine.
 The Dīwān, his collection of poetry spanning five volumes, mostly unedited. The printed versions available are based on only one volume of the original work.
 The Holy Spirit in the Counselling of the Soul (Rūḥ al-quds), a treatise on the soul which includes a summary of his experience from different spiritual masters in the Maghrib. Part of this has been translated as Sufis of Andalusia, reminiscences and spiritual anecdotes about many interesting people whom he met in al-Andalus.
 Contemplation of the Holy Mysteries (Mashāhid al-Asrār), probably his first major work, consisting of fourteen visions and dialogues with God.
 Divine Sayings (Mishkāt al-Anwār), an important collection made by Ibn 'Arabī of 101 hadīth qudsī
 The Book of Annihilation in Contemplation (K. al-Fanā' fi'l-Mushāhada), a short treatise on the meaning of mystical annihilation (fana).
 Devotional Prayers (Awrād), a widely read collection of fourteen prayers for each day and night of the week.
 Journey to the Lord of Power (Risālat al-Anwār), a detailed technical manual and roadmap for the "journey without distance".
 The Book of God's Days (Ayyām al-Sha'n), a work on the nature of time and the different kinds of days experienced by gnostics
 The Astounding Phoenix regarding the Seal of Saints and the Sun of the West, a book on the meaning of sainthood and its culmination in Jesus and the Mahdī
 The Universal Tree and the Four Birds (al-Ittihād al-Kawnī), a poetic book on the Complete Human and the four principles of existence
 Prayer for Spiritual Elevation and Protection ('al-Dawr al-A'lā), a short prayer which is still widely used in the Muslim world
 The Interpreter of Desires (Tarjumān al-Ashwāq), a collection of nasībs which, in response to critics, Ibn Arabi republished with a commentary explaining the meaning of the poetic symbols. (1215)
 Divine Governance of the Human Kingdom (At-Tadbidrat al-ilahiyyah fi islah al-mamlakat al-insaniyyah).
 The Four Pillars of Spiritual Transformation (Hilyat al-abdāl) a short work on the essentials of the spiritual Path

The Meccan Illuminations (Futūḥāt al-Makkiyya)

According to Claude Addas, Ibn Arabi began writing Futūḥāt al-Makkiyya after he arrived in Mecca in 1202. After almost thirty years, the first draft of Futūḥāt was completed in December 1231 (629 AH), and Ibn Arabi bequeathed it to his son. Two years before his death, Ibn ‘Arabī embarked on a second draft of the Futūḥāt in 1238 (636 AH), of which included a number of additions and deletions as compared with the previous draft, that contains 560 chapters. The second draft, the more widely circulated version, was bequeathed to his disciple, Sadr al-Din al-Qunawi. There are many scholars attempt to translate this book from Arabic into other languages, but there is no complete translation of Futūḥāt al-Makkiyya to this day.

The Bezels of Wisdom (Fuṣūṣ al-Ḥikam)
There have been many commentaries on Ibn 'Arabī's Fuṣūṣ al-Ḥikam: Osman Yahya named more than 100 while Michel Chodkiewicz precises that "this list is far from exhaustive." The first one was Kitab al-Fukūk written by Ṣadr al-Dīn al-Qunawī who had studied the book with Ibn 'Arabī; the second by Qunawī's student, Mu'ayyad al-Dīn al-Jandi, which was the first line-by-line commentary; the third by Jandī's student, Dawūd al-Qaysarī, which became very influential in the Persian-speaking world. A recent English translation of Ibn 'Arabī's own summary of the Fuṣūṣ, Naqsh al-Fuṣūṣ (The Imprint or Pattern of the Fusus) as well a commentary on this work by 'Abd al-Raḥmān Jāmī, Naqd al-Nuṣūṣ fī Sharḥ Naqsh al-Fuṣūṣ (1459), by William Chittick was published in Volume 1 of the Journal of the Muhyiddin Ibn 'Arabi Society (1982).

Critical editions and translations of Fuṣūṣ al-Ḥikam 
The Fuṣūṣ was first critically edited in Arabic by 'Afīfī (1946) that become the standard in scholarly works. Later in 2015, Ibn al-Arabi Foundation in Pakistan published the Urdu translation, including the new critical of Arabic edition. 

The first English translation was done in partial form by Angela Culme-Seymour from the French translation of Titus Burckhardt as Wisdom of the Prophets (1975), and the first full translation was by Ralph Austin as Bezels of Wisdom (1980). There is also a complete French translation by Charles-Andre Gilis, entitled Le livre des chatons des sagesses (1997). The only major commentary to have been translated into English so far is entitled Ismail Hakki Bursevi's translation and commentary on Fusus al-hikam by Muhyiddin Ibn 'Arabi, translated from Ottoman Turkish by Bulent Rauf in 4 volumes (1985–1991).

In Urdu, the most widespread and authentic translation was made by Shams Ul Mufasireen Bahr-ul-uloom Hazrat (Muhammad Abdul Qadeer Siddiqi Qadri -Hasrat), the former Dean and Professor of Theology of the Osmania University, Hyderabad. It is due to this reason that his translation is in the curriculum of Punjab University. Maulvi Abdul Qadeer Siddiqui has made an interpretive translation and explained the terms and grammar while clarifying the Shaikh's opinions. A new edition of the translation was published in 2014 with brief annotations throughout the book for the benefit of contemporary Urdu reader.

In fiction

In the Turkish television series Diriliş: Ertuğrul, Ibn Arabi was portrayed by Ozman Sirgood. In 2017, Saudi Arabian novelist Mohammed Hasan Alwan won the International Prize for Arabic Fiction for his novel A Small Death, a fictionalized account of Ibn Arabi's life.

See also
 Mujaddid
 Akbariyya
 Ivan Aguéli
 Hossein Nasr
 Mahmud Shabistari
 Miguel Asín Palacios
 Ain al-Kheil Mosque
 Ibn al-Arif
 Ibn Masarra
 Ibn Barrajan
 Abu-l-Qasim Ahmad ibn al-Husayn ibn Qasi

References

Sources

Citations

Bibliography

Books by Ibn Arabi
This is a small selection of his many books.

In Arabic
 Ibn ‘Arabī. Al-Futūḥāt al-Makkiyya, Vols. 1–4. Beirut: n.p.; photographic reprint of the old edition of Bulaq 1329/1911 which comprises four volumes each about 700 pages of 35 lines; the page size is 20 by 27cm. Print.
 Ibn ‘Arabī, Ibrāhīm Madkūr, and ʻUthmān Yaḥyá. Al-Futūḥāt al-Makkiyya, Vols. 1–14,. al-Qāhirah: al-Hayʼah al-Miṣrīyah al-ʻĀmmah lil-Kitāb, 1972. Print. this is the critical edition by Osman Yahya. This version was not completed, and the 14 volumes correspond to only volume I of the standard Bulaq/Beirut edition.
 Ibn ‘Arabī, Fuṣūṣ al-Ḥikam. Beirut: Dar al-Kitab al-'Arabī. Print.
 Ibn ‘Arabī. Sharḥ Risālat Rūḥ Al-quds fī Muḥāsabat Al-nafs. Comp. Mahmud Ghurab. 2nd ed. Damascus: Naḍar, 1994. Print.
 Ibn ‘Arabī. Inshā’ al-Dawā’ir, Beirut: Dar al-kutub al-‘Ilmiyya. 2004. Print.
 Ibn ‘Arabī. Rasā’il Ibn ‘Arabī (Ijāza li Malik al-Muẓaffar). Beirut: Dar al-kutub al-‘Ilmiyya, 2001. Print.
 Ibn ‘Arabī. Rasā'il Ibn al-'Arabî (Kitāb al-Jalāla). Hyberadad-Deccan: Dā’irat al-Ma‘ārif al-‘Uthmāniyya, 1948. Print.
 Ibn ‘Arabī. Kitāb al Bā’. Cairo: Maktabat al-Qāhira, 1954. Print.
 Ibn ‘Arabī, Risālat ila Imām al-Rāzī. Hyberadad-Deccan: Dā’irat al-Ma‘ārif al-‘Uthmāniyya, 1948. Print.

In English
 
 
 Ibn ‘Arabī. Nasab al-Khirqa. Trans. Gerald Elmore. Vol. XXVI. Oxford: Journal of the Muhyiddin Ibn ‘Arabi Society, 1999. Print.
 Ibn ‘Arabī. Divine Sayings The Mishkāt Al-Anwār of Ibn 'Arabi. Oxford: Anqa, 2005. Print.
 Ibn 'Arabi. The Meccan Revelations. Pir Press, 2010

Books about Ibn 'Arabi
 Addas, Claude, Quest for the Red Sulphur, Islamic Texts Society, Cambridge, 1993. .
Addas, Claude, Ibn Arabi: The Voyage of No Return, Cambridge, 2019 (second edition), Islamic Texts Society. .
 Akkach, Samer, Ibn 'Arabî's Cosmogony and the Sufi Concept of Time, in: Constructions of Time in the Late Middle Ages, ed. Carol Poster and Richard Utz. Evanston, IL: Northwestern University Press, 1997. Pp. 115-42.
 Titus Burckhardt & Bulent Rauf (translator), Mystical Astrology According to Ibn 'Arabi (The Fons Vitae Titus Burckhardt Series) 

 Henry Corbin,  Alone with the Alone; Creative Imagination in the Sūfism of IbnʿArabī, Bollingen, Princeton 1969, (reissued in 1997 with a new preface by Harold Bloom).
 Elmore, Gerald T. Ibn Al-'Arabī’s Testament on the Mantle of Initiation (al-Khirqah). Journal of the Muhyiddin Ibn ‘Arabi Society XXVI (1999): 1-33. Print.
 Elmore, Gerald T. Islamic Sainthood in the Fullness of Time: Ibn Al-‘Arabī's Book of the Fabulous Gryphon. Leiden: Brill, 1999. Print.
 
 Hirtenstein, Stephen, and Jane Clark. Ibn 'Arabi Digital Archive Project Report for 2009  Muhyiddin Ibn 'Arabi 1165AD - 1240AD and the Ibn 'Arabi Society. Dec. 2009. Web. 20 Aug. 2010.
 Knysh, Alexander. Ibn 'Arabi in the Later Islamic Tradition: The making of a polemical image in medieval Islam. Albany, NY: SUNY Press, 1999.
 Torbjörn Säfve, "Var inte rädd" ('Do not be afraid'), 
 Yahia, Osman. Mu'allafāt Ibn ʻarabī: Tārīkhuhā Wa-Taṣnīfuhā. Cairo: Dār al-Ṣābūnī, 1992. Print.
 Yousef, Mohamed Haj. Ibn 'Arabi - Time and Cosmology (London, Routledge, 2007) (Culture and Civilization in the Middle East).
 Yūsuf, Muhammad Haj. Shams Al-Maghrib. Allepo: Dār al-Fuṣṣilat, 2006. Print.

External links
 
 
 Ibn Arabi Society page about Ibn Al 'Arabi
 Ibn Arabi & Mystical Journey:The Journey to the Lord of Power  (John G. Sullivan, Department of Philosophy at Elon College)
 Le concept d'amour chez Ibn 'Arabi 
 Ibnarabi.net - Download Books
 حكم من يدعي إجماع أهل السنة على تكفير الإمام محيي الدين بن العربي—Dar al-Ifta al-Misriyyah 
 Ibn ‘Arabi and Wahdat al-Wujud
Ibn 'Arabi's poem Tarjuman Al Ashwaq (The Interpreter of Desires), translated by Yasmine Seale and Robin Moger

Articles with imported Creative Commons Attribution-ShareAlike 3.0 text
1165 births
1240 deaths
12th-century Arabic poets
13th-century Arabic poets
Ibn Arabi
Zahiris
Asharis
People from Murcia
Philosophers from al-Andalus
Islamic philosophers
Sufi poets
Sufi mystics
Sufi saints
Sufis from al-Andalus
Arabs from al-Andalus
13th-century writers from al-Andalus
12th-century writers from al-Andalus